Alkali Nassara Club is a Nigerien football club based in Zinder, a town approximately 14 hours east of the capital Niamey.  The team competes in the Niger Premier League.

External links

Team profile - soccerway.com

Football clubs in Niger
Zinder